Caffrocrambus alcibiades is a moth in the family Crambidae. It was described by Stanisław Błeszyński in 1961. It is found in South Africa.

References

Endemic moths of South Africa
Crambinae
Moths described in 1961
Moths of Africa